Khvormiz or Khurmiz or Khoormiz, also rendered as Khormiz or Kharmiz may refer to:
 Khvormiz-e Olya
 Khvormiz-e Sofla
 Khvormiz Rural District